The 2018 Vuelta a Burgos was a men's road bicycle race which was held from 7 August to 11 August 2018. It is the 40th edition of the Vuelta a Burgos stage race, which was established in 1946. The race was rated as a 2.HC event and forms part of the 2018 UCI Europe Tour. The race was made up of five stages. Iván Sosa of  won the race.

Teams
Fifteen teams entered the race. Each team had a maximum of seven riders:

Route

Results

Classification leadership

References

External links

2018
2018 UCI Europe Tour
2018 in Spanish road cycling
August 2018 sports events in Spain